Alzounoub  is a commune of the Cercle of Goundam in the Tombouctou Region of Mali. The seat lies at Sonima. As of 1998 the commune had a population of 2,923. It covers an area of 7853 km².

References

Communes of Tombouctou Region